Mark Schmidt (born February 12, 1963) is an American college basketball coach and the current men's basketball head coach at St. Bonaventure University.

Career
He took the job at the start of the 2007–08 season after holding the same position at Robert Morris University for six seasons (2001–2007), compiling a record of 82–90. Prior to becoming the head coach at Robert Morris, he served as an assistant coach at Xavier University under Skip Prosser from 1994 to 2001. During the 2008–09 season, he led St. Bonaventure to a 15–15 record, and an appearance in the Atlantic 10 postseason tournament, the school's first since 2005. Schmidt has led the Bonnies to Atlantic 10 Tournament Championships in 2012 and 2021 in addition to Atlantic 10 regular season championships in 2016 and 2021. In 2016, he was named Atlantic 10 Coach of the Year. He is the all-time wins leader in St. Bonaventure history passing  Larry Weise (202 wins) on February 17, 2019. Schmidt has coached 24 players who went on to play professionally including Andrew Nicholson and Jaylen Adams.

He played collegiately for the Boston College Eagles from 1981 to 1985 under coaches Tom Davis and Gary Williams. He graduated from Bishop Feehan High School in Attleboro, Massachusetts in 1981, and is inducted in the Bishop Feehan Hall of Fame for his school record in the 3000m Steeplechase. He is still the school's second all-time leading scorer with a total of 1,450 points.

Head coaching record

References

1963 births
Living people
American men's basketball coaches
American men's basketball players
Basketball coaches from Massachusetts
Basketball players from Massachusetts
Boston College Eagles men's basketball players
College men's basketball head coaches in the United States
Loyola Greyhounds men's basketball coaches
Penn State Nittany Lions basketball coaches
Place of birth missing (living people)
Robert Morris Colonials men's basketball coaches
Saint Michael's Purple Knights men's basketball coaches
St. Bonaventure Bonnies men's basketball coaches
Xavier Musketeers men's basketball coaches